Deral Lamont Boykin (born September 2, 1970) is a former American football safety in the National Football League (NFL) for the Los Angeles Rams, Washington Redskins, Philadelphia Eagles, and Jacksonville Jaguars.  He played college football at the University of Louisville and was drafted in the six round of the 1993 NFL Draft.

References

1970 births
Living people
American football safeties
Washington Redskins players
Los Angeles Rams players
Jacksonville Jaguars players
Philadelphia Eagles players
Players of American football from Ohio
Louisville Cardinals football players
Sportspeople from Kent, Ohio